The Presbytery of Redstone is a Presbytery of the Presbyterian Church (U.S.A.) governing congregations in Westmoreland, Fayette, Somerset, and Cambria Counties in Western Pennsylvania.  Its headquarters in located in Greensburg, Pennsylvania.  It governs 80 congregations and 14,971 total congregants.  It is part of the Synod of the Trinity.

References

History of Pennsylvania
Presbyterian organizations established in the 18th century
Presbyterian Church (USA) presbyteries
Religious organizations established in 1781
1781 establishments in Pennsylvania